The Große Pyra  is a river of Saxony, Germany. It is a right tributary of the Zwickauer Mulde, which it joins in Morgenröthe-Rautenkranz.

See also
List of rivers of Saxony

Rivers of Saxony
Rivers of the Ore Mountains
Rivers of Germany